Varicospira is a genus of sea snails, marine gastropod mollusks in the family Rostellariidae within the Stromboidea, the true conchs and their allies.

Distribution
Species of this genus occur in the Central Indo-west Pacific and off Australia (Queensland, Western Australia)

Species
Species within the genus Varicospira include:
 Varicospira bekenuensis Raven, 2021
 Varicospira cancellata (Lamarck, 1816)
 Varicospira crispata (G. B. Sowerby II, 1842)
 †  Varicospira decussata (J.L.M. Defrance in B. de Basterot, 1825 ) 
 Varicospira formosana (M. Yokoyama, 1928) 
 † Varicospira gerthi (A. Pannekoek, 1936) 
 † Varicospira integra (A. von Koenen, 1889)  
 Varicospira javana (K.Martin, 1879)
 Varicospira kooli Moolenbeek & Dekker, 2007
 Varicospira longirostra (Pannekoek, 1936)
 † Varicospira martini (A. Pannekoek, 1936) 
 Varicospira mordax (K.Martin, 1916)
 † Varicospira narica (E.W. Vredenburg, 1925 ) 
 † Varicospira rakhiensis (F.E. Eames, 1952)  
 †  Varicospira rembangensis (A. Pannekoek, 1936) 
 Varicospira reticulata Raven, 2021
 † Varicospira semicancellata (Martin, 1899)  
 † Varicospira sindiensis (E.W. Vredenburg, 1925) 
 † Varicospira spinifera (Martin, 1899)
 † Varicospira subrimosa (A.V.M.D. D'Orbigny, 1852)
 † Varicospira tenuiincisus (F.E. Eames, 1952) 
 † Varicospira toyamaensis (K. Tsuda, 1959   
 Varicospira tyleri (H. Adams & A. Adams, 1864)
 Varicospira zuschini Harzhauser, 2007
Species brought into synonymy
 Varicospira lee Iredale, 1958: synonym of Varicospira cancellata (Lamarck, 1816)
Nomen dubium
 Varicospira speciosa (H. Adams & A. Adams, 1864)

References

 F. E. Eames. 1952. A contribution to the study of the Eocene in Western Pakistan and Western India: C. The description of the Scaphopoda and Gastropoda from standard sections in the Rakhi Nala and Zindar Pir areas of the Western Punjab and in the Kohat District. Philosophical Transactions of the Royal Society of London Series B 236:1-168
 M. Harzhauser. 2007. Oligocene and Aquitanian gastropod faunas from the Sultanate of Oman and their biogeographic implications for the western Indo-Pacific. Palaeontographica Abteilung A 280:75-121
 M. Harzhauser, M. Euter, W. E. Piller, B. Berning, A. Kroh and O. Mandic. 2009. Oligocene and Early Miocene gastropods from Kutch (NW India) document an early biogeographic switch from Western Tethys to Indo-Pacific. Palaeontologische Zeitschrift 83:333-372
 H. S. Ladd. 1972. Cenozoic fossil mollusks from Western Pacific Islands; Gastropods (Turritellidae through Strombidae). United States Geological Survey Professional Paper 532:1-79 
 H. S. Ladd. 1982. Cenozoic fossil mollusks from Western Pacific Islands; Gastropods (Volutidae through Terebridae). United States Geological Survey Professional Paper 1171:1-100 
 J. J. Sepkoski. 2002. A compendium of fossil marine animal genera. Bulletins of American Paleontology 363:1-560

External links

Rostellariidae